Kokkini Rachi is a mountain located in Cephalonia.

References

Mountains of Greece
Landforms of Cephalonia
Mountains of the Ionian Islands (region)